E42, E-42 or E.42 may refer to:
 European route E42, a road connecting France, Belgium and Germany
 Esposizione Universale Roma, a business district in Rome, Italy
 HMS E42, a United Kingdom Royal Navy E class submarine which saw service during World War I
 Nimzo-Indian Defense, Encyclopaedia of Chess Openings code
 EUR, Rome
 Hanwa Expressway (between Wakayama JCT and Nanki-Tanabe IC), Kisei Expressway, Nachikatsuura-Shingū Road and Kumano-Owase Road, route E42 in Japan